Leah Hackett  (born 15 August 1985) is an English actress, best known for her role as Tina Reilly in Hollyoaks.

Early life
Hackett was born in Bolton, Greater Manchester to a mixed race ( English mother / African/American father) father and an English mother . She worked in Tyldesley Library as a teenager. She attended Tyldesley Primary School before moving to Fred Longworth High School. She later attended Winstanley College and went on to get a place at Liverpool Institute for Performing Arts.

She appeared in Reemer's video for the single Maniac.

Personal life
In January 2020, she announced she was pregnant with her first child. On 3 April 2020, she gave birth to her daughter, called Skylar.

Hackett co-owns clothing rental boutique The Closet in Liverpool with Hollyoaks co-stars Jennifer Metcalfe and Claire Cooper.

Career
Hackett played timid Tina Reilly in Channel 4 soap Hollyoaks. She played the role for over two years between 3 August 2006, until her character's death on 17 October 2008. She reprised the role for one episode on 20 November 2014. Hackett appeared in the Liverpool Nativity on 16 December 2007 as a shepherdess. In July 2008, Hackett was the face selected to launch the Polaroid PoGo. She also appeared in a series of videos promoting the Year of Food and Farming where she milks a cow, shears sheep, collects eggs and makes an ice cream at Blaze Farm in Cheshire. She appeared in a pantomime (Dick Whittington), at Buxton Opera House and she played Alice Witzwarren. She appeared as Clare Saunders in an episode of Doctors, titled "The Mathematics of Marriage", which aired 15 December 2010.

Stage appearances
 November 2010, Pub (musical drama), Royal Exchange, Manchester 
 June to July 2013, Manchester - The Massacre (a promenade performance drama splicing the Peterloo Massacre of 1819 and the Hacienda Movement of 1989), Library Theatre company

Filmography

Television

References

External links

1985 births
Living people
British television actresses
Actors from Bolton
Black British actresses
Actresses from Lancashire
English soap opera actresses
Alumni of the Liverpool Institute for Performing Arts
English people of African-American descent